Paul Grumeau (28 June 1881 – 22 May 1955) was a Belgian footballer. He played in one match for the Belgium national football team in 1905. Grumeau also played for R.U. Saint-Gilloise, appearing in 125 matches and scoring 21 goals.

References

External links
 

 

1881 births
1955 deaths
Belgian footballers
Belgium international footballers
Association football midfielders
Footballers from Brussels
Royale Union Saint-Gilloise players
Belgian football managers
Royale Union Saint-Gilloise managers
Lierse S.K. managers